Bundy may refer to:

Places
Bundy, Idaho, a place in Nez Perce County, Idaho
Bundy, Virginia, an unincorporated community
Bundy, Wisconsin, an unincorporated community
Bundy Drive, a street on the west side of Los Angeles
Expo/Bundy station, a light rail station in Los Angeles County

People

Surname
Alan Bundy (born 1947), Edinburgh professor and artificial intelligence researcher
Bill Bundy (1883–1945), English footballer
Carol M. Bundy (1942–2003), female serial killer
Cliven Bundy (born 1946), controversial American rancher
Ammon Bundy and Ryan C. Bundy, sons of Cliven Bundy and participants in several demonstrations resulting from disputes with the government over land use and ranching fees
Doc Bundy (born 1946), American race car driver
Dorothy Cheney (1916–2014), American tennis champion and daughter of Tom and May Sutton Bundy
Dylan Bundy (born 1992), American baseball player
Edgar Bundy (1862–1922), English painter
Francis P. Bundy (1910–2008), American physicist, inventor, and glider pilot
Gilbert Bundy (1911–1955), American cartoonist and illustrator
Harvey Hollister Bundy (1888–1963), Assistant US Secretary of State
Hezekiah S. Bundy (1817–1895), American politician
John Elwood Bundy (1853–1933), American Impressionist painter
King Kong Bundy (born 1957), ring name of American professional wrestler Chris Pallies
Laura Bell Bundy (born 1981), American actress
Marquis Bundy (born 1994), American football player
May Godfrey Sutton Bundy (1886–1975), American tennis champion and wife of Tom Bundy
McGeorge Bundy (1919–1996), head of the Ford Foundation and member of Kennedy administration 
Olivia Newton Bundy (born 1968), stage name of Brian Tutunick, of the rock group Marilyn Manson 
Omar Bundy (1861–1940), U.S. Army general
Sam D. Bundy (1906–1983), American politician and educator
Solomon Bundy (1823–1889), American politician and lawyer
Ted Bundy (1946–1989), American serial killer, necrophile, kidnapper, and rapist, born Theodore Robert Cowell
Tom Bundy (1881–1945), American tennis player
Trace Bundy (born 1977), American acoustic guitar player
William Bundy (1917–2000), American foreign affairs advisor to presidents Kennedy and Johnson

Other people
Bundy K. Brown, American musician
George Bundy Smith (1937–2017), American judge
Allen Christensen (footballer) (born 1991), Australian rules footballer

Art, entertainment, and media
Bundy, the surname of a dysfunctional family on the sitcom Married... with Children
Al Bundy, head of the family
"Bundy", a song by Animal Alpha from the 2005 album Pheromones

Biology
Bundy, a common name for the tree species Eucalyptus goniocalyx

Brands and enterprises
Bundy (DNS server), the successor version of the BIND 9 DNS server software
A colloquial name for Australia's Bundaberg Rum
A slang term for a time clock, named for its inventor, Willard L. Bundy, or for the Bundy Manufacturing Company
A line of musical instruments manufactured by The Selmer Company
Bundy Manufacturing Company, an American manufacturer of timekeeping devices, now part of IBM

Law
Bundy standoff, A 20-year legal dispute between Cliven Bundy and the U.S.A. BLM division
Lloyds Bank Limited v Bundy, a leading English contract case on unequal bargaining power

See also
 Bundey (disambiguation)